Julie Is Her Name is the first LP album by Julie London, released by Liberty Records in December, 1955, under catalog numbers LRP-3006, in monaural form. It was subsequently reprocessed to produce a stereophonic album, and this stereophonic version was released on May 25, 1960 as catalog number LST-7037. The album featured Barney Kessel on guitar and Ray Leatherwood on bass.

The first track, "Cry Me a River", was released as a single (Liberty 55006) and was London's biggest chart success.

The album was reissued, combined with the 1958 Julie London album Julie Is Her Name, Volume II, in compact disc format, by EMI in 1992. Another reissue as a CD was produced by Hallmark Music, combined with the 1956 Julie London album, Lonely Girl.

Track listing

References

External links

Julie Is Her Name (Adobe Flash) at Myspace (streamed copy where licensed)

Liberty Records albums
Julie London albums
1955 debut albums
Albums produced by Bobby Troup